Steganotaenia araliacea is a species of flowering plant in the family Apiaceae. It is found in Angola, Benin, Botswana, Cameroon, Democratic Republic of Congo, Ethiopia, Kenya, Mozambique, Namibia, Somalia, South Africa, Sudan, Tanzania, Togo, Uganda, Zambia, Zimbabwe.

Active compounds 

Plant contains a number of substances with antimitotic and antitubulin activity on various lines of neoplasmic cells:
 Steganacin
 Stegangin
 Steganolide A
 Steganol
 Steganone
 Epistegangin (Steganone ketone)
 Steganoate B

References

External links

Apioideae